Baron James Mayer de Rothschild  (born Jakob Mayer Rothschild; 15 May 1792 – 15 November 1868) was a German-French banker and the founder of the French branch of the Rothschild family.

Early life
James de Rothschild was born in Frankfurt-am-Main, then part of the Holy Roman Empire. He was the fifth son and youngest child of Mayer Amschel Rothschild (1744–1812) and Guttle Schnapper (1753–1849).

Career
In 1812, he moved to Paris to co-ordinate the purchase of specie and bullion for his brother Nathan Mayer Rothschild (1777–1836), and in 1814 and 1815 he was the linchpin in Nathan's plan to furnish Wellington's armies with funds. In 1817 he expanded the family banking empire to the city, opening De Rothschild Frères. By 1823 the Paris House was firmly established as banker to the French government.

An adviser of ministers and kings, he became the most powerful banker in the country and following the Napoleonic Wars, played a major role in financing the construction of railroads and the mining business that helped make France an industrial power. Along the way, he added to his fortune with investments in such things as the importation of tea and the wine industry. A strong-willed and shrewd businessman, de Rothschild amassed a fortune that made him one of the richest men in the world.

In 1822 de Rothschild, along with his four brothers, was awarded the hereditary title of "Freiherr" (Baron) by Emperor Francis I of Austria. That same year he was appointed consul-general of the Austrian Empire and in 1823 was awarded the French Legion of Honour.

Following the July 1830 Revolution that saw King Louis Philippe come to power, de Rothschild put together a loan package to stabilize the finances of the new government, and in 1834 a second loan. In gratitude for his services to the French nation, Louis Philippe elevated him to the dignity of Grand Officer of the Legion of Honour.

King Louis Philippe was forced to abdicate after the outbreak of the French Revolution of 1848. Under Emperor Napoleon III, de Rothschild lost part of his political influence, however, despite some difficulties, the family business survived and prospered under the new regime. Since 1852 he had also to defend the attacks of the bank Crédit Mobilier. The conflict between the Rothschilds and the rival company also spread to other countries. De Rothschild succeeded in maintaining the leading position of his house.

In addition to his banking business, in 1868 de Rothschild purchased Château Lafite, one of France's most outstanding vineyards. Located in the Bordeaux region, it is a business that remains in the family to this day.

Personal life
On 11 July 1824, in Frankfurt, Germany, de Rothschild married his niece Betty von Rothschild (1805–1886), the daughter of his elder brother, Salomon Mayer von Rothschild (1774–1855). They had the following children:

 Charlotte de Rothschild (1825–1899), who married Nathaniel de Rothschild (1812–1870)
 Mayer Alphonse de Rothschild (1827–1905), who married Leonora de Rothschild (1837–1911), the daughter of Lionel de Rothschild of the English branch of the family.
 Gustave Samuel de Rothschild (1829–1911), who married Cécile Anspach
 Salomon James de Rothschild (1835–1864), who married Adèle von Rothschild (1843–1922), daughter of his cousin Mayer Carl von Rothschild
 Edmond Benjamin de Rothschild (1845–1934), who married Adelheid von Rothschild (1853–1935), daughter of Wilhelm Carl von Rothschild and Mathilde Hannah von Rothschild of the Naples branch of the Rothschild family

De Rothschild and his sophisticated Viennese wife were at the center of Parisian culture. The chef for their lavish receptions was Antonin Carême. They patronized major personalities in the arts, including Gioacchino Rossini, Frédéric Chopin, Honoré de Balzac, Eugène Delacroix, and Heinrich Heine. As an acknowledgment of the many years of patronage extended by Baron James and his wife Betty, in 1847 Chopin dedicated his Valse Op. 64, N° 2 in C sharp minor to their daughter Charlotte. In 1848 Jean Auguste Dominique Ingres painted Betty de Rothschild's portrait.

Personality

After the death of Nathan in 1836, James took over the management of the family firm. His 
sons, brothers and nephews were in awe of his dynamic authority. Contemporaries 
remembered his quick wit, expressed in a heavy German accent, though the sharp tongue 
which went with it was not always benign. James was devoted to his extended family, but it 
was not beyond him to turn against any member whom he felt to have acted improperly. 
His response to the marriage of his niece, Hannah Mayer, displayed at once his demand 
for obedience and his faithfulness to the family's Jewish beliefs.

Residence
In 1817, de Rothschild purchased Château Rothschild in Boulogne-Billancourt, where his children were born and reared. In 1838 he purchased from Charles Maurice de Talleyrand a large residence in Paris, at 2 rue Saint-Florentin on the Place de la Concorde. It remained in the family until 1950, when it was sold to the United States government; today it serves as the consular section of the American Embassy.

Ferrières was inaugurated 16 December 1862 with a gala attended by Napoleon III. The property remained the home of his inheriting male descendants until 1975, when Guy de Rothschild gave it to the University of Paris. Considered to be the largest and most luxurious 19th-century château in France.

Art collection

Beyond his business activities, de Rothschild was an avid collector of art, fuelled not only by a desire to show himself the equal in taste and possessions of any of the French aristocracy but by a genuine interest. The purchase of Greuze's painting, La Laitière, in 1818 formed the basis of a magnificent art collection which he supplemented often in frenzied buying sprees from the grand sales of the Paris hotels.

Horse racing

In 1835 Baron James de Rothschild created racing stables at his Ferrières estate. Still in existence, now relocated to Normandy, the Rothschild stables are one of the oldest in France. Ferrières was the perfect location, close to both Paris and Chantilly, which was the centre of the horse-racing world in France. Initially the majority of horses belonging to Baron James raced under the colours of their trainer, Thomas Carter, in amber vest, lilac sleeves and grey cap. This was soon changed to the now famous blue vest and yellow cap, variations of which are still used by different members of the Rothschild family. The stables were successful in James's lifetime with victories in the Grand Prix Royal in 1844 won by Drummer, and the Prix du Jockey Club in 1846 won by Médon.

Philanthropy

De Rothschild also used his enormous wealth for philanthropic works and became a leader of the French Jewish community. His contributions to France, along with those of his offspring, can be found in many fields, including medicine and the arts. He was involved in many charities: anti-tuberculosis dispensaries, the first social housing in Paris, or aid provided to Assistance Publique.

Funeral
Baron James de Rothschild died in 1868, just three months after purchasing the Chateau Lafite vineyard. As Nathaniel de Rothschild reported, on his funeral, 4,000 guests waited in his drawing rooms, while another 6,000 guests waited in the courtyard. The streets of Paris, from the Rue Laffitte across to Père Lachaise Cemetery, were lined with unknown thousands of citizens, who paid tribute to the banker. De Rothschild had remained active in business throughout his life, expanding his railways, industries, factories, shipping, and mining interests so successfully that by the time of his death, the capital of the Paris house perhaps even exceeded some of his other prominent family members.

Sons Alphonse and Gustave took the reins of a vast French business empire, whose industrial interests spread as far afield as Africa and the South Sea Islands.

See also
Great Synagogue (Petah Tikva)

References

In popular culture
The House of Rothschild (1934) directed by Alfred L. Werker. He was played by Murray Kinnell.
Die Rothschilds (1940) directed by Erich Waschneck. He was played by Albert Lippert.

Further reading
 Grunwald,  Kurt. "Europe's Railways and Jewish Enterprise: German Jews as Pioneers of Railway Promotion." Leo Baeck Institute Yearbook 12.1 (1967): 163–209, on Rothschild and the Pereire brothers.

External links

French bankers
German bankers
French art collectors
French philanthropists
French viticulturists
German philanthropists
French railway entrepreneurs
German viticulturists
Recipients of the Legion of Honour
18th-century German Jews
James Mayer
French people of German-Jewish descent
People from the Free City of Frankfurt
Burials at Père Lachaise Cemetery
1792 births
1868 deaths
Jewish philanthropists
19th-century French businesspeople
19th-century German businesspeople
German emigrants to France